Husum station (Swedish: Husums station or Husums resecentrum) is a railway station just outside Husum, Sweden, Sweden. The station opened in 2010 as part of the new Bothnia Line from Sundsvall to Umeå. The station is served by regional Norrtåg rail services.

The station building, with staircases from ground level to the high-level platform, feature artwork by sculptor Åke Lagerborg. The artwork was originally made for the Norrland Engineer Battalion garrison in Boden, but was relocated and thus changed name from Högt spel i Boden to Högt spel i Husum.

References

Railway stations in Västernorrland County
Railway stations opened in 2010
Bothnia Line